The cut locus is a mathematical structure defined for a closed set  in a space  as the closure of the set of all points  that have two or more distinct shortest paths in  from  to .

Definition in a special case 

Let  be a metric space, equipped with the metric , and let  be a point.

Examples 
For example, let S be the boundary of a simple polygon, and X the interior of the polygon.
Then the cut locus is the medial axis of the polygon.  The points on the medial axis are centers of maximal disks that touch the polygon boundary at two or more points, corresponding to two or more
shortest paths to the disk center.

As a second example, let S be a point x on the surface of a convex polyhedron P, and X the surface itself.  Then the cut locus of x is what is known as the ridge tree of P with respect to x.  This ridge tree has the property that cutting the surface along its edges unfolds P to a simple planar polygon.  This polygon can be viewed as a net for the polyhedron.

Example for the special case 
Let , that is the regular 2-sphere. Then the cut locus of every point on the sphere consists of exactly one point, namely the antipodal one.

References

Mathematical structures

de:Schnittort
ru:Множество раздела